In Roman and Etruscan mythology, Mania (or Manea) was a goddess of the dead. She, along with Mantus, ruled the underworld. She was said to be the mother of ghosts, the undead, and other spirits of the night, as well as the Lares and the Manes. Her name links her to the Manes, Mana Genita, and Manius.

Both the Greek and Latin Mania derive from PIE (Proto-Indo-European) *men-, "to think." Cognates include Ancient Greek , and Avestan .

In Roman and Etruscan mythology, Mania (Manea) is the goddess of Spirits and Chaos. In Greek mythology, she is the goddess of insanity and madness (Maniae).

See also
Mother of the Lares (Latin Mater Larum), Roman chthonic goddess identified with Mania by Varro.
 Roman festivals
 Lemuria (festival)

References

Death goddesses
Etruscan goddesses
Roman goddesses
Undead
Underworld goddesses